Chlorothiazide, sold under the brand name Diuril among others, is an organic compound used as a diuretic and as an antihypertensive.

It is used both within the hospital setting or for personal use to manage excess fluid associated with congestive heart failure.  Most often taken in pill form, it is usually taken orally once or twice a day. In the ICU setting, chlorothiazide is given to diurese a patient in addition to furosemide (Lasix). Working in a separate mechanism from furosemide and absorbed enterically as a reconstituted suspension administered through a nasogastric tube (NG tube), the two drugs potentiate one another.

It was patented in 1956 and approved for medical use in 1958. It is on the World Health Organization's List of Essential Medicines.

Indications 
 Large amount of excess fluid including:
Heart failure
Peripheral edema
Hypertension

Contraindications 
Anuria
 Allergies to sulfa drugs

Side effects 
 Nausea / Vomiting
 Headache
 Dizziness
 Excess urine production
 Dehydration
 Hypoelectrolytemia (esp. hypokalemia / hypomagnesia)

History 
The research team of Merck Sharp and Dohme Research Laboratories of Beyer, Sprague, Baer, and Novello created a new series of medications, the thiazide diuretics, which includes chlorothiazide.  They won an Albert Lasker Special Award in 1975 for this work.

The structure has been determined by X-ray crystallography.

See also 
 Hydrochlorothiazide

References 

Thiazides
Benzothiadiazines
Sultams
Merck & Co. brands
Carbonic anhydrase inhibitors
World Anti-Doping Agency prohibited substances
X